Air Post may refer to:

Air Post, a New Zealand cargo airline
The Air Post, a location in the video game Kya: Dark Lineage
Assistant Chief of the Air Staff head of the RAF